Thorgerda is a 19th-century poem by John Payne. The subject of the poem, Thorgerda, is a woman who threatens to commit suicide in the Egil's Saga.

See also
Freyja
Naglfar

British poems